ITIM may refer to:

ITIM: Resources and Advocacy for Jewish Life
Immunoreceptor tyrosine-based inhibitory motif
ITIM (news agency)
International Tibet Independence Movement
IBM Tivoli Identity Manager, an IBM software product for managing user access to computer resources
ITIM: IT Infrastructure Monitoring